Fugging, spelt Fucking until 2021, is an Austrian village in the municipality of Tarsdorf, located in the Innviertel region of western Upper Austria.

Despite a population of only 106 in 2020, the village has drawn attention in the English-speaking world for its former name, which was spelled the same as an inflected form of the vulgar English-language word "fuck". Its road signs were a popular visitor attraction and were often stolen by souvenir-hunting vandals until 2005, when they were modified to be theft-resistant. A campaign to change the village's name to Fugging, which is pronounced the same in the local dialect, was rejected in 2004 but succeeded in late 2020.

Former name 

The settlement is believed to have been founded in the 6th century AD by Focko, a Bavarian nobleman. The Austrian region during this century was mostly under the domain of the Kingdom of the Ostrogoths and was populated by a mix of Christians and Pagans. The existence of the village was documented for the first time in 1070, and historical records show that some 20 years later, the lord was recorded in Latin as Adalpertus de Fucingin. The spelling of the name, which is pronounced with the English language vowel oo as in book, evolved over the years; it is first recorded in historical sources as Vucchingen in 1070, as Fukching in 1303, as Fugkhing in 1532, and in the modern spelling Fucking in the 18th century.  The ending -ing is an old Germanic suffix indicating the people belonging to the root word to which it is attached, thus Fucking means "(place of) Focko's people".

Demographics 
The Austrian census of 2020 recorded that the village had a population of 106. The Age reported in 2005 that it had 104 inhabitants and 32 houses.

Popularity and notoriety 
Fugging is best known for the four traffic signs at the entrances to the village, beside which many English-speaking tourists have had their photograph taken because of the profane English word with the same spelling as the former name. British and US soldiers based in nearby Salzburg noticed the name after World War II and began to travel to the village to have their photos taken beside the signs. The local residents, the Fuckingers, were bemused, as they had not previously been aware of the meaning of their village's name in English. During the second half of the 20th century and the early 21st century, the number of tourists visiting the village increased, including the occasional tour bus.

The village is especially popular with British tourists; as a local tour guide explained: "The Germans all want to see Mozart's house in Salzburg; the Americans want to see where The Sound of Music was filmed; the Japanese want Hitler's birthplace in Braunau; but for the British, it's all about Fucking." Augustina Lindlbauer, the manager of an area guesthouse, said that the area had lakes, forests, and vistas worth visiting, but there was an "obsession with Fucking", and she had to explain to a British tourist "that there were no Fucking postcards". The English meaning of its name also resulted in the village being the butt of jokes in popular media. The Grand Tour featured the village in the 2017 episode "[censored] to [censored]", as part of a road trip from Wank via Kissing, Petting, and Fucking to Wedding. In 2019, Norwegian broadcasting company NRK Sport produced a comedic tourism video on Fucking. Released on YouTube, the video consists of the reporter and the former Melodi Grand Prix Junior presenter Nicolay Ramm both advertising the village's attractions and listing off a large number of double entendres based on its name. 

The road signs were commonly stolen as souvenirs, and cost some 300 euros to replace. In 2005 theft-resistant welded signs were installed, secured in concrete. The Mayor of Tarsdorf said that tourists were still welcome, though the local police chief emphasised that "we will not stand for the Fucking signs being removed. It may be very amusing for you British, but Fucking is simply Fucking to us. What is this big Fucking joke? It is puerile." One resident set up a website selling T-shirts featuring the signs, with the slogan "I like Fucking in Austria", but shut it down after other residents disapproved.

In 2009, the village said it would install surveillance cameras to deter tourists from continuing to attempt to steal the road signs. The mayor said that he would prefer not to see the village featured in the press anymore: "Just leave [us] alone".

Also in 2009, the European Union's OHIM trademarks agency forbade a German brewery to market a beer called "Fucking Hell". They appealed and were granted permission in January 2010. (The second part of the name is the German term for a pale lager, Hell.)

Name change 
A 2004 vote on changing the village's name failed. "Everyone here knows what it means in English, but for us Fucking is Fuckingand it's going to stay Fucking" says the mayor as he pointed out that the name had been Fucking for 800 years.

In April 2012, rumours spread through international media that villagers had been thinking about changing the name of the village or had actually voted to change it. The satirical website The Spoof! published a story that was expanded in the British tabloid The Daily Mirror. The story was then reported elsewhere as news, including by The Guardian and The Huffington Post, who said that a vote had taken place to change the name to Fugging, but it was discovered that a village with that name already existed in the municipality of Obritzberg-Rust just west of Herzogenburg. The mayor denied these rumours.

The council of Tarsdorf voted in their 17 November 2020 session to have the village's name officially changed to Fugging (pronounced the same as Fucking in the dialect spoken in the region), effective 1 January 2021. A video by a Danish YouTuber, Albert Dyrlund, was reportedly stated as being the reason for the name change. The following month, signs with the new name were vandalised to read "Fucking".

In literature and film

See also 

 List of unusual place names
 Oberfucking
 Unterfucking
 Shitterton, a hamlet in Dorset, England with a similar history of sign theft

References

External links 

  Tarsdorf Municipality website
 "German Firm Wins Right to Make Beer Called 'Fucking Hell'." Spiegel Online. 29 March 2010.

Cities and towns in Braunau am Inn District
Populated places established in the 6th century
Tourism in Austria
Naming controversies
Controversies in Austria